This is a list of law enforcement agencies in the state of Missouri.

According to the US Bureau of Justice Statistics' 2008 Census of State and Local Law Enforcement Agencies, the state had 576 law enforcement agencies employing 14,554 sworn police officers, about 244 for each 100,000 residents.

State agencies 

 Missouri Department of Conservation
 Protection Division
 Missouri Department of Corrections
 Missouri Department of Natural Resources
 Missouri State Park Rangers
 Missouri Department of Public Safety
 Missouri Gaming Commission
 Missouri Homeland Security
 Missouri State Capitol Police
 Missouri State Emergency Management Agency
 Missouri State Fire Marshal Investigation Unit
 Missouri State Highway Patrol
 Missouri State Water Patrol
 Missouri State Marshal

County agencies 

Adair County Sheriff's Office
Andrew County Sheriff's Office
Atchison County Sheriff's Office
Audrain County Sheriff's Office
Barry County Sheriff's Office
Barton County Sheriff's Office 
Bates County Sheriff's Office
Benton County Sheriff's Office
Bollinger County Sheriff's Office
Boone County Sheriff's Office
Buchanan County Sheriff's Office
Butler County Sheriff's Office
Caldwell County Sheriff's Office
Callaway County Sheriff's Office
Camden County Sheriff's Office
Cape Girardeau County Sheriff's Office
Carroll County Sheriff's Office
Carter County Sheriff's Office
Cass County Sheriff's Office
Cedar County Sheriff's Office
Chariton County Sheriff's Office 
Christian County Sheriff's Office
Clark County Sheriff's Office
Clay County Sheriff's Office
Clinton County Sheriff's Office
Cole County Sheriff's Office
Cooper County Sheriff's Department
Crawford County Sheriff's Office 
Dade County Sheriff's Office 
Dallas County Sheriff's Office 
Daviess County Sheriff's Office 
Dekalb County Sheriff's Office 
Douglas County Sheriff's Office 
Dunklin County Sheriff's Office 
Franklin County Sheriff's Office 
Gasconade County Sheriff's Office
Gentry County Sheriff's Office 
Greene County Sheriff's Office
Grundy County Sheriff's Office
Harrison County Sheriff's Office 
Henry County Sheriff's Office
Hickory County Sheriff's Office 
Holt County Sheriff's Office
Howard County Sheriff's Office
Howell County Sheriff's Office
Iron County Sheriff's Office
Jackson County Department of Corrections
Jackson County Park Rangers (Missouri)
Jackson County Sheriff's Office
Jasper County Sheriff's Office
Jefferson County Sheriff's Office
Johnson County Sheriff's Office
Knox County Sheriff's Office
Laclede County Sheriff's Office
Lafayette County Sheriff's Office
Lawrence County Sheriff's Office
Lewis County Sheriff's Office
Lincoln County Sheriff's Office

Linn County Sheriff's Office
Livingston County Sheriff's Office
Macon County Sheriff's Office 
Madison County Sheriff's Office
Maries County Sheriff's Office 
Marion County Sheriff's Office
McDonald County Sheriff's Office
Mercer County Sheriff's Office
Miller County Sheriff's Office
Mississippi County Sheriff's Office
Moniteau County Sheriff's Office 
Monroe County Sheriff's Office 
Montgomery County Sheriff's Office 
Morgan County Sheriff's Office
New Madrid County Sheriff's Office
Newton County Sheriff's Office
Nodaway County Sheriff's Office
Oregon County Sheriff's Office
Osage County Sheriff's Office
Ozark County Sheriff's Office
Pemiscot County Sheriff's Office
Perry County Sheriff's Office
Pettis County Sheriff's Office
Phelps County Sheriff's Office
Pike County Sheriff's Office
Platte County Sheriff's Office
Polk County Sheriff's Office
Pulaski County Sheriff's Department
Putnam County Sheriff's Office
Ralls County Sheriff's Office
Randolph County Sheriff's Office
Ray County Sheriff's Office
Reynolds County Sheriff's Office
Ripley County Sheriff's Office
Saline County Sheriff's Office
Schuyler County Sheriff's Office
Scotland County Sheriff's Office
Scott County Sheriff's Office
Shannon County Sheriff's Office
Shelby County Sheriff's Office
Saint Charles County Police Department
Saint Charles County Sheriff's Office
Saint Clair County Sheriff's Office
Saint Francois County Sheriff's Office
Saint Genevieve County Sheriff's Office
Saint Louis County Police Department
Stoddard County Sheriff's Office
Stone County Sheriff's Office
Sullivan County Sheriff's Office
Taney County Sheriff's Office
Texas County Sheriff's Office
Vernon County Sheriff's Office
Warren County Sheriff's Office
Washington County Sheriff's Office 
Wayne County Sheriff's Office
Webster County Sheriff's Office
Worth County Sheriff's Office
Wright County Sheriff's Office

City agencies 

Adrian Police Department 
Advance Police Department 
Alba Police Department 
Albany Police Department
Allendale Police Department
Anderson Police Department
Appleton City Police Department
Arnold Police Department
Ash Grove Police Department
Ashland Police Department
Aurora Police Department
Ava Police Department
Ballwin Police Department
Bates City Police Department
Bel-Nor Police Department
Bel-Ridge Police Department
Bell City Police Department
Bella Vista Police Department
Bellefontaine Neighbors Police Department
Bellflower Police Department
Belton Police Department
Berkeley Hills Police Department
Berkeley Police Department
Bernie Police Department
Bethany Police Department
Beverly Hills Police Department
Billings Police Department
Birmingham Police Department
Bismarck Police Department
Bland Police Department
Bloomfield Police Department
Blue Springs Police Department
Bolivar Police Department
Bonne Terre Police Department
Booneville Police Department
Bourbon Police Department
Bowling Green Police Department
Branson Police Department
Braymer Police Department
Breckenridge Hills Police Department
Brentwood Police Department
Bridgeton Police Department
Brookfield Police Department
Browning Police Department
Brunswick Police Department
Buckner Police Department
Buffalo Police Department
Butler Police Department
Byrnes Mill Police Department
Cabool Police Department
California Police Department
Calverton Park Police Department
Camdenton Police Department
Cameron Police Department
Carthage Police Department
Cassville Police Department
Charleston Police Department
Chesterfield Police Department
Chillicothe Police Department
Claycomo Police Department
Clayton Police Department
Columbia Police Department
Country Club Hills Police Department 
Crocker Police Department 
De Soto Police Department
Doniphan Police Department
Eastborough Police Department
East Prairie Police Department
Edmundson Police Department
Edwardsville Police Department
Eureka Police Department
Excelsior Springs Police Department
Fair Grove Police Department 
Ferguson Police Department
Flordell Hills Police Department 
Florissant Police Department
Frontenac Police Department
Garden City Police Department
Gladstone Police Department
Grain Valley Police Department
Grandview Police Department

Hannibal Police Department
Hanley Hills Police Department
Hawk Point Police Department
Hazelwood Police Department
Hillsdale Police Department
Independence Police Department
Jefferson City Police Department
Jonesburg Police Department
Joplin Police Department
Kahoka Police Department
Kansas City Police Department
Kirksville Police Department
Kirkwood Police Department
Ladue Police Department
Lakeshire Police Department
Lake Lotawana Police Department
Lake Winnebago Police Department
Lee's Summit Police Department
Liberty Police Department
Licking Police Department
Lone Jack Police Department
Manchester Police Department
Maplewood Police Department
Marceline Police Department
Moline Acres Police Department
Montgomery City Police Department
Mount Vernon Police Department
Nevada Police Department
Nixa Police Department
Normandy Police Department
North Kansas City Police Department
North Woods Police Department
O'Fallon Police Department
Oakview Police Department
Old Monroe Police Department
Overland Police Department
Pacific Police Department
Pagedale Police Department
Parkville Police Department
Parma Police Department
 Peculiar Police Department
 Pine Lawn Police Department
Platte City Police Department
Platte Woods Police Department
Pleasant Hill Police Department
Pleasant Valley Police Department
Poplar Bluff Police Department
Raymore Police Department
Raytown Police Department
Richland Police Department
Riverside Police Department
Rock Hill Police Department
Rolla Police Department 
Saint Ann Police Department
Saint Joseph Police Department
Smithville Police Department
St. Charles City Police Department
St. Louis City Sheriff's Office
St. Louis Metropolitan Police Department
St. Louis Airport Police Department
St. Robert Police Department
Sedalia Police Department
Sikeston Police Department
Sparta Police Department
Springfield Police Department
Sunset Hills Police Department
Town and Country Police Department
Troy Police Department
Truesdale Police Department
Velda City Police Department
Warrensburg Police Department
Warrenton Police Department
Warson Woods Police Department
Washington Police Department
Waynesville Police Department
Webb City Police Department
Webster Groves Police Department
Wentzville Police Department
Weston Police Department
Wright City Police Department

Regional agencies 
 North County Police Cooperative

Disbanded agencies
Charlack Police Department
City of Dellwood Police Department
Holt Police Department
Jennings Police Department
Mosby Police Department
Odessa Police Department
Randolph Police Department
Uplands Park Police Department
Vinita Park Police Department
Wellston Police Department
New Franklin Police Department (temporarily)

References

Missouri
Law enforcement agencies of Missouri
Law enforcement agencies